Natalya Aleksandrovna Mammadova  (born 2 December 1984) is a retired Ukrainian and Azerbaijani volleyball player. Natalya played as an outside hitter and is widely recognized as one of the best players of her generation, as well as the most successful Azerbaijani volleyball player. Natalya represented Azerbaijan national team from 2004 until 2018 and is one of the most capped players in the history of the country. She announced her retirement from volleyball in May 2021.

Career
Natalya won the League Round "Best Scorer" award three seasons in a row, from 2004/05 with Azerrail Baku also winning the League Round "Best Attacker"; in 2005/06 and the 2006/07.

Mammadova lost the final game at the 2010–11 CEV Champions League Final Four with her team Rabita Baku, finishing as Runner-up and winning the "Best Server" award.

Mammadova won the bronze medal at the 2015 FIVB Club World Championship, playing with the Swiss club Voléro Zürich.

Awards

Individuals
 2004–05 CEV Indesit Champions League League Round "Best Scorer"
 2004–05 CEV Indesit Champions League League Round "Best Attacker"
 2005–06 CEV Indesit Champions League League Round "Best Scorer"
 2006 Swiss Championship Finals "Best Scorer"
 2006–07 CEV Indesit Champions League League Round "Best Scorer"
 2007 "European Player of the Year"
 2007 Swiss Championship "Most Valuable Player"
 2007 Swiss Championship "Best Scorer"
 2007 Swiss Cup "Most Valuable Player"
 2009–10 Russian Superleague "Best Scorer"
 2010–11 CEV Champions League Final Four "Best Server"
 2010–11 Azerbaijan Superleague "Best Spiker"
 2011–12 Azerbaijan Superleague "Most Valuable Player"
 2012–13 Russian Superleague "Best Scorer"
 2017 Russian Cup "Most Valuable Player"

Clubs
 2002–03 Russian Cup –  Champion, with Zarechie Odintsovo
 2003–04 Azerbaijan Superleague –  Champion, with Azerrail Baku
 2004–05 Azerbaijan Superleague –  Champion, with Azerrail Baku
 2005–06 Swiss Championship –  Champion, with Voléro Zürich
 2005–06 Swiss Cup –  Champion, with Voléro Zürich
 2007–08 Spanish Superliga –  Runner-Up, with İcaro Palma
 2008–09 Turkish Women's Volleyball League –  Bronze medal, with Türk Telekom Ankara
 2009–10 Russian Superleague –  Bronze medal, with Dinamo Krasnodar
 2010–11 CEV Champions League –  Runner-Up, with Rabita Baku
 2010–11 Azerbaijan Superleague –  Champion, with Rabita Baku
 2011 FIVB Club World Championship –  Champion, with Rabita Baku
 2011–12 Azerbaijan Superleague –  Champion, with Rabita Baku
 2012–13 Russian Superleague –  Bronze medal, with Omichka Omsk
 2013–14 Russian Superleague –  Bronze medal, with Omichka Omsk
 2015 FIVB Club World Championship –  Bronze medal, with Voléro Zürich
 2017 FIVB Club World Championship –  Bronze medal, with Voléro Zürich
 2017 Russian Cup –   Champion, with WVC Dynamo Kazan

References

External links
 
FIVB Profile
Voléro Zürich Profile
Italian League Profile

1984 births
Living people
Sportspeople from Donetsk
Ukrainian women's volleyball players
Azerbaijani women's volleyball players
Ukrainian emigrants to Azerbaijan
Naturalized citizens of Azerbaijan
Sportspeople from Baku
Türk Telekom volleyballers
Expatriate volleyball players in Italy
Expatriate volleyball players in Russia
Expatriate volleyball players in Spain
Expatriate volleyball players in Switzerland
Expatriate volleyball players in Turkey
Outside hitters
Azerbaijani expatriate sportspeople in Italy
Azerbaijani expatriate sportspeople in Russia
Azerbaijani expatriate sportspeople in Spain
Azerbaijani expatriate sportspeople in Switzerland
Azerbaijani expatriate sportspeople in Turkey
Azerbaijani expatriate sportspeople in China
Azerbaijani expatriate sportspeople in France
Expatriate volleyball players in China
Expatriate volleyball players in France